The 2000–01 Australia Tri-Nation Series (more commonly known as the 2000–01 Carlton Series) was a One Day International (ODI) cricket tri-series where Australia played host to West Indies and Zimbabwe. Australia and West Indies reached the Finals, which Australia won 2–0.

Squads

Points table

Result summary

1st match

2nd match

3rd match

4th match

5th match

6th match

7th match

8th match

9th match

10th match

11th match

12th match

Final series
Australia won the best of three final series against West Indies 2–0. This was the first time Australia had won the best of 3 finals against West Indies. And this was the second time, the first since the 1996/97 season, that West Indies had lost the best of 3 finals 2-0.

1st Final

2nd Final

External links
 Series home at Cricinfo

References

Australian Tri-Series
2000 in Australian cricket
2001 in Australian cricket
2000 in West Indian cricket
2001 in West Indian cricket
2000 in Zimbabwean cricket
2001 in Zimbabwean cricket
2000–01 Australian cricket season
2000–01
2000–01
International cricket competitions in 2000–01